Little Monsters may refer to:
Little Monsters (1989 film), a comedy-drama film starring Fred Savage and Howie Mandel
Little Monsters (TV series), a 1998 BBC/ITV TV series
Little Monsters (game show), a 2003 Sky One game show
Little Monsters (2019 film), a comedy horror film
Little Monsters, fans of the American singer Lady Gaga
"Little Monsters", a 1995 episode of the TV series Beverly Hills, 90210
"Little Monsters", a 2003 episode of the TV series Charmed

See also
Little Monster, a novel series by Mercer Mayer
"Little Monster" (song), a song by Royal Blood